Margaret Mascarenhas was an American novelist, poet, essayist and independent curator. Born in United States and of Goan origin, she spent some of her childhood years in Caracas, Venezuela. She died on 14 July 2019.

Career
 She was the author of the novels Skin and The Disappearance of Irene Dos Santos.

Skin, a diasporic novel, moves from a bar in California to life in a Goan village, and has formed part of post-colonial academic discourse around the world since it was published by Penguin in 2001. Skin has been described as a "story of a contemporary woman who traces her cross-continental family diaspora which originates with the Portuguese slave trade in India in the 17th century."  It has been translated into French and Portuguese. The Disappearance of Irene Dos Santos was selected for the Indie Next List and was a Barnes & Noble Discover Pick in 2009.

Her poetry and sketch collection, Triage--casualties of love and sex was released in 2013.

Fiction
Skin. Penguin 2001; 
The Disappearance of Irene Dos Santos. Hachette 2009:

Poetry
Triage--casualties of love and sex. Harper Collins 2013;

Other writing
Mascarenhas' essays and articles have been published in Marg, Colloquio Letras, Urban Voice, and elsewhere. Her op-ed columns and book reviews have appeared in numerous print and online publications, including Outlook, India Today, TOI Crest, Hindustan Times, Goa Today, and The Navhind Times Panorama.

Other pursuits

In the mid-2000s, Mascarenhas began a mailing list with Wendell Rodricks, urging citizens to report cases of lack of waste management in Goa. She was the founding co-director the Blue Shores Prison Art Project, a prison art curriculum designed for inmates that focuses on the interrelationships between image and text. She was on the Advisory Boards of the Sunaparanta Goa Centre for the Arts and Goa Photo.

In the 2010 edition of Skin, she wrote:

In its first avatar, and all its reprints, the penultimate draft of the MS of Skin was the version published by Penguin India, an accidental slip never amended for nine years, mostly because the penultimate version did fine. However, this has always been an issue I knew I would eventually want to address, given the time and the opportunity, which presented themselves recently. My purpose in republishing Skin is of course to correct an error that has bothered me for a long time, like an itch. But my purpose in doing it in collaboration with Broadway and Goa,1556 is to highlight the nexus between literature and art and to promote Goa-based writers and artists/art photographers. On the cover of this edition is a painting by Ravi Kerkar. Hopefully, we will be seeing a line of books emerging from this collaboration that makes it a point to use local talent for cover art.

Personal life
Mascarenhas' blog described her as a "dog whisperer" and one who "sometimes masquerades as jazz singer and chef". She spent the final years of her life in Goa, from where her father originated. There she was a prominent figure in the writing circuit, and also mentored other writers through workshops and other events.

Mascarenhas died in Goa, following a long illness (she was believed to have been suffering from cancer), on 14 July 2019. She was in her late fifties.

References

External links
About the author on her website 
Author's profile 
"História, memória e imaginação" / Margaret Mascarenhas. In: Revista Colóquio/Letras. Crónica, n.º 177, Maio 2011, p. 171-175. 
Yale post colonial symposium speaker 
Review of The Disappearance of Irene Dos Santos in Publishers Weekly 
Review, Le Monde 
R. Benedito Ferrão, The Other Black Ocean: Indo-Portuguese Slavery and Africanness Elsewhere in Margaret Mascarenhas's Skin in Vol. 45, No. 3, Africa and the Black Atlantic (Fall 2014), pp. 27-47.
The DNA of Slavery, review by Dale Luis Menezes
Reading, Sahitya Akademi 
As a Jaipur Literature Festival speaker 
Profile in New Indian Express 
Blue Shores Prison Art Project on Timecrest.com

Women writers from Goa
Indian women novelists
2019 deaths
Indian women poets
Poets from Goa
21st-century Indian poets
Place of death missing
21st-century Indian novelists
21st-century Indian women writers
Novelists from Goa
Year of birth missing
American emigrants to India
American expatriates in Venezuela
American people of Goan descent